Meiling is a scenic town located in Jiangxi province, Nanchang city, in the north of Wanli District, Nanchang. Meiling is located inside the Meiling National Forest Park. , it has 2 residential communities, 3 residential quarters and 5 villages under its administration. These include the villages Meiling, Lixin, Dongchang, Tuanjie, Yuanjia, and the residential communities Dianqian, Wayao, as well as living quarters of Xichang Zone, Xiangyang Forest Zone, and Xiaoling Forest Zone.

Over 80% of the area of Meiling town is hilly. Meiling's most abundant crop is rice, and is green with Mao bamboo and Pine.  The beauty spots of Meiling town include Hongya Dan wells, Meiling Dragon pond, Bamboo Sea Pearl, XiYao Lake, and Lion peak. Meiling town is also known as "the little Mount Lu".

Major Attractions

Hongya Dan wells 
Hongya Dan wells(洪崖丹井) is one of the top ten scenery of Yuzhang(Nanchang) as well as one of the oldest historic sites of China. The well existed since around 5500–6000 years ago. Hongya Dan wells is the leading scenery of Meiling, and is also said to be the origin of ancient Chinese music.
 
Ling Lun was the music officer of the Yellow Emperor.  According to the legend, Ling Lun came to Hongya, and dug five wells. The posterity of Ling Lun call him Mr. Hongya. In the ninth year of the Sui dynasty, all the administrative regions of China were named "state".  Because of Mr. Hongya, Yuzhang county was named Hong state.

Meiling Dragon pond
Dragon pond(神龙潭), is located in the hinterland of Meiling area, about 30 kilometers away from Nanchang city.  A natural scenery as the basis, mountain style, folk customs for the cultural connotations. Dragon is famous of our winding streets, waterfalls, singing river etc. Dragon pond has longtan waterfall with God, Tigers Spring Falls, Lake Tam Tam Falls, Dragons Valley, Lan Zhu River, Buddha Ridge, the Millennium Yew and other natural scenery.

Bamboo Sea Pearl 
Meiling Bamboo Pearl(竹海明珠)is formerly known as Meiling peak, located in the hinterland of Meiling scenic area. 12 km away from the Bay City, 27 km from the center of Nanchang. Scenic area is 6.2 square kilometers, there are "flowers old ridge", Sword trying peak, Wulao mount, Yang mount and another dozen peaks. The main peak's height is more than 800 meters above sea level.

XiYao Lake 
XiYao lake(洗药湖)is located in Luohan mountain, the highest peak of the scenic area in Meiling in Nanchang, 841 meters above the sea level, and the average temperature is 8-10 degrees lower than the urban area of Nanchang, is one of the thirteen summer resort in China.

Lion peak 
Meiling Lion Peak(狮子峰)consists of Lion Peak, Panxi Lake and looking Lion Stream. The mountain is shaped like a crooked lion, so people named it the Lion Peak. Meiling Lion Peak is only 260 meters high, but its steep is close to Huangshan, cliffs, with strange rocks and  forest. Mount Feilai(飞来峰) is the most magnificent and most spectacular place of the granite inverted heap geomorphology, which reflects the megalithic mountain structure and the magnificent mountainous process.

References

External links 
 http://www.nctour.com.cn/jingdian/list/0_1_4_0_0_0_1/
 http://www.wl.nc.gov.cn/Index.shtml

Township-level divisions of Jiangxi
Nanchang